The ZSSK Class 757 is a four axle diesel electric locomotive, created from the rebuilding of older class 750 locomotives. The locomotives were ordered by Železničná spoločnosť Slovensko for use on passenger services on Slovak main lines. Between 2010 and 2015, 25 locomotives were rebuilt by ŽOS Zvolen.

Rebuilding 
Following to České dráhy rebuilding their 750 and 753 locomotives into the 750.7, it was decided to carry out similar rebuilds in Slovakia. The project was started in 2010, when contracts were awarded and the first locomotive began reconstruction. However, unlike the Czech locomotives, the ZSSK rebuilds were more gradual, with the locomotives still required for normal services. The first locomotive was finished in 2011, and following testing it was put into service at Zvolen. The second was completed by the end of the year. From then until 2015 rebuilds progressed at a rate of around 5 to 6 per year. The final rebuilt was locomotive 25, finished in Autumn 2015. New locomotives were allocated to Košice, Prievidza and Humenné.

References 

Diesel-electric locomotives of Slovakia
Bo′Bo′ locomotives
Railway locomotives introduced in 2010